The coat of arms of Bolivia has a central cartouche surrounded by Bolivian flags, cannons, laurel branches, and has an Andean condor on top.

Official description
Bolivian law describes the coat of arms as follows:

The coat of arms of the Republic of Bolivia is elliptical in shape. In the upper part is a rising sun appearing behind the Cerro Rico with skies at dawn. In the center, the Cerro Rico of Potosí and the Cerro Menor. On the upper part of the smaller hill, the Chapel of the Sacred Heart of Jesus. In the lower left part of the landscape formed by the hills, a llama. To its right a sheaf of wheat and a palm. Around the shield, a blue oval with golden inner edge. In the upper half of the oval, the inscription BOLIVIA in golden capital letters. In the lower half of the oval, ten golden stars of five points. At each flank, three national flags, a cannon, two rifles, an axe to the right and a liberty cap to the left. Surmounting the shield, an Andean condor in rising attitude. Behind the condor, two interlaced branches of laurel and olive. The laurel to the left and the olive to the right forming a wreath. When relevant, the field outside the shield shall be pearl blue.

Gallery

See also
 Flag of Bolivia

References

Sources

 FlagsoftheWorld.com: Bolivia
 Bolivian.com: Reformas y Deformaciones del Escudo de las Armas de la República de Bolivia

External links
Bolivia could put coca leaves on coat of arms, Reuters.com

National symbols of Bolivia
Bolivia
Bolivia
Bolivia
Bolivia
Bolivia
Bolivia
Bolivia
Bolivia
Bolivia
Bolivia
Bolivia
Bolivia
Bolivia